All Harm Ends Here is the fourth full-length recording by American indie rock band Early Day Miners. It was originally released on Indiana label Secretly Canadian.

Track listing
"Errance" – 4:30
"Townes" – 4:20
"The Union Trade" – 6:05
"Comfort/Guilt" – 3:30
"All Harm" – 4:08
"Precious Blood" – 2:33
"We Know in Part" – 5:41
"The Way We Live Now" – 3:48
"The Purest Red" – 5:18

Personnel
Dan Burton: vocals, guitar
Joseph Brumley: guitar
Kirk Pratt: guitar
Matt Griffin: drums
Jonathan Richardson: bass

References

2005 albums
Early Day Miners albums
Secretly Canadian albums